This is a list detailing the electoral history of the Libertarian Party in the United States, sorted by office. The list currently consists of candidates who ran for partisan office.

Legend

Elections of party officers

National committee chairman and vice-chairman

Other 2012 Chairman candidates were:
 R. Lee Wrights (withdrew his name from consideration)
 Chuck Moulton (declined to be nominated)
 Wes Wagner (declined to be nominated)
 Jim Lark (declined to be nominated)
 Ernie Hancock (didn't receive votes)

Other 2012 Vice-Chairman candidates were:
 Mark Rutherford (declined to be nominated)

Federal elections

President

Presidential ballot access

Presidential and vice presidential nominations

Candidates seeking to win the Libertarian Party nominations either for president or vice president must gather thirty "tokens", or supporting delegates, and their votes in order to be put onto the actual nominating ballot. However, that still does not prevent write-in votes when the balloting is being held.

1996

Note: Jo Jorgensen was nominated by a voice vote.

2000

2004

Note: Jim Burns withdrew himself from consideration four hours before the balloting for the presidential nomination began.

2008

2012

2016

2020

The Senate

Class I seats

Class II seats

Class III seats

House of Representatives
In April 2020, Representative Justin Amash from Michigan's 3rd congressional district became the first Libertarian member of Congress, after switching from the Republican Party and spending time as an independent. However, Amash has never been elected as a Libertarian, and is not seeking re-election in 2020.

Overall summary

Alaska

Nevada

Washington

State elections

Gubernatorial elections

Notes

References 

Libertarian Party
Libertarian Party (United States)